The 2021–22 season of Flamengo Basketball is the 102nd season of the club, and the club's 14th in the Novo Basquete Brasil (NBB).

Flamengo Basketball seasons